Claudja Barry (born in 1952) is a Jamaican-born Canadian singer. Her successful songs were "Down and Counting", "Boogie Woogie Dancin' Shoes" (which peaked at #56 on Billboard Hot 100 on June 9, 1979), "Dancing Fever", and others. As an actress, she is known for appearing in the European versions of stage musicals AC/DC and Catch My Soul.

Career

Early career
At the age of six, Barry and her family emigrated from Jamaica to Scarborough, Ontario, Canada. After graduation from high school, Barry left for London where she eventually landed a role in the musical AC/DC by Heathcote Williams and after that in a German production of Catch My Soul. The play toured Europe where she eventually wound up in West Germany in the spring of 1975. That same year she signed with Hot Foot label and released a single called "Reggae Bump". It was released in Canada under the Hansa label.

Barry had some success with her recordings. She had two Billboard Hot 100 entries, the first being "Dancin' Fever" which peaked at No. 72, off The Girl Most Likely album, the other song being "Boogie Woogie Dancin' Shoes" (R&B No. 37, Pop No. 56 in 1979) from the album I Wanna Be Loved By You, released in 1978. Both became major mainstream pop hits in Canada (where "Dancin' Shoes" peaked at No. 7 on the RPM 100 national chart on April 7, 1979, and remained on the chart for 23 weeks) as well as in Europe. All her studio albums were produced in Germany by Jürgen Korduletsch.

In 1976, the soulful ballad, "Love for the Sake of Love", received airplay and in 1979, the single, "Boogie Tonight", from the I Wanna... album, received Canadian airplay, sharing the charts with "Dancin' Shoes" and reaching No. 42 on June 23, 1979.  Also in 1979, she won a Juno Award for being the Most Promising Female Vocalist of the Year.

The 1980s
With the release of her Feel The Fire album in 1980, Claudja's songs were becoming highly synthesized – this was her final album to feature an earthier, more horn & string approach to the production of her music. In 1981, she made a successful foray into new wave/Hi-NRG music with the album Made in Hong Kong. It featured the lead single "Radio Action", which became a moderate club hit peaking at No. 57.

In 1985, she appeared in the movie, Rappin', starring Mario Van Peebles. The year 1985 also saw the release of the single, "Born To Love" which sounds similar to a Pet Shop Boys or Erasure song. This single was produced by Jürgen Korduletsch with New York City based Hi-NRG producer, singer, and songwriter, Bobby Orlando. "Born To Love" peaked at No. 14 on Hot Dance Music/Club Play chart. Dance format radio stations in the United States did not give it major exposure since the album it was lifted from was a UK-only release.

On the Hot Dance Music/Club Play chart, she has had much more success: six Top 10 hits, including "Down and Counting", which spent a week at No. 1 in 1986. At the time, the song also became only her third single to chart outside of the Billboard Club Songs chart in the U.S., peaking at a No. 98 on the Hot R&B/Hip-Hop Singles & Tracks. Barry had further successes on that chart with the singles "Can't You Feel My Heartbeat" (No. 33 R&B) and "Secret Affair" (No. 60 R&B). "Down and Counting" was the lead single from her album, I, Claudja, her only full-length record for Epic Records.

The 1990s
After her run at Epic did not result in another album, she focused her music career on her fans in Canada and abroad. She still remained active recording a pair of underground club classics during the early 1990s. The singles "Love Is An Island" (1991) and "Summer of Love" (1992) are highly regarded club hits to those who know them. She covered a Prince song called "When 2 R in Love" in 1992 on Radikal Records. In 1993, the German euro-dance project General Base featured Barry as lead singer for their single "Poison", which got a greater success. "Summer of Love" was successful enough that it maintains radio airplay on some radio stations such as WMPH. Both singles became major hits outside of the U.S. A Christmas/Holiday Dance album titled, Disco'round The Christmas Tree was released on Radikal Records in 1995, then an extended mix compilation titled, Disco Mixes.  Before the decade ended, she recorded another song called, "Reach Out For Me" on Tony Green Organization Records in 1997.

1999 to present
In 1999, R&B artist Montell Jordan sampled the rhythm track from Barry's single "Love For the Sake of Love," for the hit titled, "Get It On Tonite" (No. 4 on the Billboard Hot 100 ). In the year 2000, Da Brat also released a song with the same sample featuring Tyrese called "What'chu like" which reached number 26 on the Billboard Hot 100.

In May 2006, Barry returned to the Billboard charts with "I Will Stand" released on Donna Jean Records. By July the song had reached the Top 10 of the Hot Dance Music/Club Play chart, peaking at No. 4 before the end of the summer. It received moderate dance radio format airplay. In 2015, Barry's eighth album titled "Come On Standup" was released as a digital download only album release through CDBaby.

Discography

Albums
1976: Sweet Dynamite – Lollipop
1977: The Girl Most Likely – Lollipop (aka Claudja)
1978: I Wanna Be Loved By You – Lollipop
1979: Feel the Fire – Hot Productions
1981: Made in Hong Kong – Hot Productions
1987: I, Claudja – Epic
2015: Come On Standup – CD Baby / Paradax Records (Digital Download only)
Compilations
1991: The Best of Claudja Barry – Hot Productions

See also
List of number-one dance singles of 1986 (U.S.)
List of artists who reached number one on the US Dance chart
Bobby Orlando

References

External links
Claudja's Official Website
Canadianbands.com Biography

1952 births
Actresses from Toronto
Black Canadian actresses
21st-century Black Canadian women singers
Canadian disco musicians
Canadian women pop singers
Canadian house musicians
Chrysalis Records artists
Epic Records artists
Hi-NRG musicians
Emigrants from British Jamaica to Canada
Canadian expatriates in the United Kingdom
Canadian expatriates in Germany
Juno Award for Breakthrough Artist of the Year winners
Living people
London Records artists
Philips Records artists
Polydor Records artists
Salsoul Records artists
Canadian women in electronic music
Musicians from Toronto
20th-century Black Canadian women singers